Julian M. Goldman is an American physician (anesthesiology and clinical informatics)  and Medical Director of Biomedical Engineering at Mass General Brigham (formerly Partners Healthcare System). He is the creator of Plug and Play Interoperability Research Program set up to promote innovation in patient safety and clinical care improve patient safety and make healthcare more efficient. He has been part of both the Harvard Medical School and Massachusetts General Hospital.

Awards 
Goldman has received the International Council on Systems Engineering Pioneer Award – INCOSE – (2010) the American College of Clinical Engineering – ACCE – Award (2009) the AAMI Foundation/Institute for Technology in Health Care Clinical Application Award (2009) and the University of Colorado Chancellor's Bridge to the Future Award.

Boards 
Goldman is joint chairman of the FCC mcHealth Task Force, the Consumer Advisory Committee Work Group on Healthcare and the HIT Policy Committee FDASIA Workgroup Regulatory Subgroup.  Goldman chairs both the ISO TC 121 Subcommittee 2 on Airway Devices and the Use Case Working Group of the Continua Health Alliance.

In the past he was an FDA Medical Device Fellowship Program Visiting Scholar and was a participant of both the NSF CISE Advisory Committee and the NCPHI's CDC BSC.

References

American physicians
Living people
Year of birth missing (living people)